The Augstenberg (also known as Piz Blaisch Lunga) is a mountain of the Silvretta Alps, located on the border between Austria and Switzerland. A secondary summit on the south has an elevation of 3,225 metres. On its eastern side the Augstenberg overlooks the Pass Futschöl (2,768 m).

References

External links
 Augstenberg on Hikr

Mountains of the Alps
Mountains of Graubünden
Mountains of Tyrol (state)
Alpine three-thousanders
Austria–Switzerland border
International mountains of Europe
Mountains of Switzerland
Scuol